The gal gestin was a Hittite military and administrative title literally meaning "chief of the wine stewards". It is considered to be one of the most important and prestigious posts of the Hittite Kingdom.

History 
As a gal gestin a commander was personally responsible for the safety of the king. In most cases he was a member of the royal family and usually the brother of the king.

A gal gestin would at times also participate in festivals, while like the gal mesedi he could command troops independent from the monarch's jurisdiction.

Sources 
Notes

References

Military ranks
Hittite titles